The 2002 FIA GT Oschersleben 500 km was the sixth round the 2002 FIA GT Championship season.  It took place at the Motorsport Arena Oschersleben, Germany, on 14 July 2002.

Official results
Class winners in bold.  Cars failing to complete 70% of winner's distance marked as Not Classified (NC).

Statistics
 Pole position – #14 Lister Storm Racing – 1:24.992
 Fastest lap – #14 Lister Storm Racing – 1:25.746
 Average speed – 146.410 km/h

References

 
 
 

O
FIA GT